Firing most commonly refers to termination of employment.

Firing may also refer to:

Operation
 Firemaking, the act of starting a fire
 Burning; see combustion
 Shooting, specifically the discharge of firearms
 Execution by firing squad, a method of capital punishment
 Pottery firing in a kiln or oven
 Pin firing, an old medical treatment applied to horses
 An action potential, where the depolarization of a neuron causes it to "fire" off an electrical signal down its axon

Material 
Fuel, any material (such as firewood) that can be burned to release energy.

Media
"Fired", a song by Ben Folds from his 2001 debut solo album Rockin' the Suburbs
Fired!, a 2007 documentary film by Annabelle Gurwitch
Fired (2010 film), an Indian horror film
Fired (1934 film), a Swedish drama film

See also
Fire and Fire (disambiguation)
Firing squad (disambiguation)
Fire-raising (disambiguation)
Fire making
Firestarter (disambiguation)